In military terms, 104th Brigade may refer to:

104th Brigade (Croatia)
104th Infantry Brigade (Philippines)
 104th Territorial Defense Brigade (Ukraine)
 104th Mixed Brigade (Republican Spain)
104th Brigade (United Kingdom)
104 Theatre Sustainment Brigade (United Kingdom)